Rosario González-Férez is a professor in the Department of Atomic, Molecular and Nuclear Physics at the University of Granada. In 2013 she was awarded the Mildred Dresselhaus Award, and in 2018 she as appointed to the IUPAP commission on Atomic, Molecular and Optical Physics.

References

External links 

Academic staff of the University of Granada
Year of birth missing (living people)
Living people
Spanish women scientists